Hard Cash (also known as Run for the Money) is a direct-to-video action heist film, released in 2002.

Plot
Hard Cash follows master thief Thomas Taylor (Slater), when he is released on parole. When working as a Paramedic, Taylor is called to an emergency at a betting office, when two armed robbers make their stand. As one gets shot, Taylor helps the female thief in need as they escape with the money. With the money hidden in the stretcher, an FBI agent (Kilmer) following and the marked money, how will they escape with the cash?

Cast
 Christian Slater – as Thomas Taylor
 Val Kilmer – as FBI Agent Mark C. Cornell
 Sara Downing – as Paige
 Vincent Laresca – as Nikita
 Balthazar Getty – as Eddie
 Bokeem Woodbine – as Rock
 Daryl Hannah – as Virginia
 Rodney Rowland - as Butch
 Holliston Coleman - as Megan
 Peter Woodward - as FBI Agent Judd Jarvis
 Michael Anthony Rosas - as José
 William Forsythe - as Bo Young
 Verne Troyer - as Attila
 Milos Milicevic - as Attila's Guard
 Peter Jason - as The Counter Boss

External links
 
 
 

2002 direct-to-video films
2002 films
2000s crime drama films
2000s heist films
American crime drama films
American heist films
Films shot in Bulgaria
MoviePass Films films
2002 drama films
2000s English-language films
Films directed by Predrag Antonijević
2000s American films